Lake Agnes is an alpine lake in the Colorado State Forest State Park occurring within the Never Summer Mountain Range.  The lake lies within glacial tarn  surrounded by a cirque consisting of Nokhu Crags, Static Peak, Mount Richthofen, Mount Mahler, and Braddock Peak. It is the deepest lake in the Colorado State Forest State Park. Lake Agnes is named after Agnes Zimmerman, the daughter of John Zimmerman, a homesteader in the area and the proprietor of the Keystone Hotel in Home, Colorado.

Further reading
Colorado Lakes and Reservoirs: Fishing and Boating Guide, P 53 
 Ralph Lee Hopkins, Lindy Birkel Hopkins, Hiking Colorado's Geology, PP 52–55

References

Agnes
Bodies of water of Jackson County, Colorado